Odododiodio is one of the constituencies represented in the Parliament of Ghana. It elects one Member of Parliament (MP) by the first past the post system of election. 

At the by-election held on the 30 August 2005, Jonathan Nii Tackie Komey (NDC) won with a majority of 8,377 to replace Samuel Nii Ayi Mankattah also of the NDC who had died earlier.

Boundaries
The seat is located entirely within the Accra Metropolitan Area in turn within the Greater Accra Region of Ghana.

Members of Parliament

Elections

See also
 List of Ghana Parliament constituencies
 Parliamentary constituencies in the Greater Accra Region

References 

Parliamentary constituencies in the Greater Accra Region